Ashfield-Croydon was an electoral district for the Legislative Assembly in the Australian state of New South Wales was created in from 1959, combining the former districts of  Ashfield and Croydon. It was abolished in 1968, when it was replaced by the re-created district of Ashfield.

Members for Ashfield-Croydon

Election results

References

Former electoral districts of New South Wales
1959 establishments in Australia
Constituencies established in 1959
1968 disestablishments in Australia
Constituencies disestablished in 1968